Shitlang Pale is an Indian politician from Meghalaya. He has been a member of the All India Trinamool Congress since November 2021; previously, he was a longtime member of the Indian National Congress. He was elected as a member of the Legislative Assembly of Meghalaya from SUTNGA SAIPUNG in 2018.

References

Trinamool Congress politicians
Meghalaya MLAs 2018–2023
Living people
1976 births